Wesley Barrow Stadium is a 650-seat baseball and softball stadium located in the Pontchartrain Park section of New Orleans, Louisiana. Named in memory of Negro league baseball manager Wesley Barrow, a longtime prominent figure in the New Orleans baseball community, the stadium includes a 200-square-foot climate-controlled press box, a public address system and LED scoreboard. The baseball field features professional-sized artificial turf with a clay pitcher's mound and two fenced bullpens.

The facility also includes grass tee-ball fields, a three-lane outdoor batting practice cage and a two-lane indoor batting practice building. It also includes administration facilities and two 300-square-foot conference rooms.

It is the current site of the Major League Baseball Urban Youth Academy in New Orleans. The academy will provide free, year-round baseball and softball instruction and other educational services for youth from underserved and urban communities throughout southern Louisiana.

History
Wesley Barrow Stadium was built in 1957 and has served as the home for Louisiana High School Athletic Association baseball games, Loyola Wolfpack baseball and UNO Privateers baseball in 2013.

The facility was destroyed by Hurricane Katrina, but after a 6.5 million renovation was reopened in 2012. The funding was provided by Major League Baseball, the city of New Orleans and the Federal Emergency Management Agency (FEMA).

In 2021, the stadium became the home field for the Xavier University Gold Nuggets women's softball team.

See also
Major League Baseball Urban Youth Academy
Reviving Baseball in Inner Cities

References

External links
 MLB Urban Youth Academy - New Orleans, LA

Baseball venues in New Orleans
Softball venues in New Orleans
College baseball venues in the United States
Loyola Wolf Pack baseball
New Orleans Privateers baseball
High school baseball venues in the United States
Sports venues completed in 1957
1957 establishments in Louisiana